Roshmitha Harimurthy (born 13 August 1994) is an Indian model and beauty pageant titleholder who was crowned as Miss Universe India 2016 at Sardar Vallabhbhai Patel Indoor Stadium, Mumbai. As winner of Miss Diva - 2016, she represented India at Miss Universe 2016 in Manila, Philippines.

Early life
Harimurthy was born and raised in Bangalore. She belongs to Kannadiga family. Her sister, Rakshita Harimurthy is also a beauty pageant titleholder. She did her schooling from Sophia High School, Bengaluru and later finished her master's degree in international business from Mount Carmel College, Bangalore.

Pageantry
Harimurthy began auditioned for the title Femina Miss India Bangalore, where she was winner and get a direct entry to Femina Miss India 2016 as finalist. On final night, she reached the top 5 finalist and win the special awards "Miss Spectacular Eyes" and "Miss Rampwalk" in the event.

Miss Diva - 2016
Still the same year, she participated in Miss Diva - 2016 contest and won the title of Miss Diva Universe 2016 where she was crowned by outgoing titleholder Urvashi Rautela.

Miss Universe 2016
She represented India at Miss Universe 2016 which was held at Mall of Asia Arena, Pasay, Metro Manila, Philippines on 29 January 2017 and was unplaced.

References

Femina Miss India
Miss Universe 2016 contestants
Indian beauty pageant winners
Female models from Bangalore
Living people
1994 births
Mount Carmel College, Bangalore alumni